The 2020 Acrobatic Gymnastics World Championships was the 27th edition of acrobatic gymnastics competition. It was originally scheduled to take place in Geneva, Switzerland from 29 May to 31 May 2020. However, due to the COVID-19 pandemic it was postponed and took place on 2 July to 4 July 2021.

Medal summary

Medal table

Results

References

External links
Results book

Acrobatic Gymnastics World Championships
Acrobatic Gymnastics World Championships
Acrobatic Gymnastics World Championships
Acrobatic Gymnastics World Championships
Acrobatic Gymnastics World Championships